Morchella steppicola, the morel of the steppes, is a species of fungus in the family Morchellaceae (Ascomycota). Originally described from the steppic meadows of Ukraine in 1941, this ancient relic of the last ice age corresponds to Mes-1, the earliest-diverging phylogenetic lineage in section Esculenta.

Other than its unique –for the genus– ecological adaptation, this species boasts some remarkable features, such as the densely "blistered" or "merulioid" ridges of its cap, a chambered stem, and strongly striate spores.

References

External links

Fungi described in 1941
Fungi of Europe
steppicola